Montrose Football Club is a Scottish semi-professional football team, based in the town of Montrose, Angus. The club was founded in 1879. They are members of the Scottish Professional Football League and currently play in Scottish League One, the third tier of football in Scotland.

History

Early years 
The first Montrose Football Club was formed on 25 February 1871 after a meeting of local young men seeking to organise the practice of the 'national game of football' on the Links of Montrose. The variety of football played at the time did not resemble the modern game and was more akin to rugby. Friendly matches amongst club members and townsfolk, Montrose Academical, Arbroath and Aberdeen University were played over the next few years before the club was dissolved. On 8 September 1877, a new football club was formed at a meeting at Montrose Academy.

During the new club's annual meeting on 13 October 1879 at the Town's Buildings, the committee unanimously resolved to change the rules of the club to those of General Association, with an association rules match amongst club members played later that week on 18 October 1879.

The club played their first external association rules match against Arbroath Wanderers on 8 November 1879. Given the fact that the Montrose side were unfamiliar with new rules of the game, the team unsurprisingly lost 4–0. They are the 18th oldest association football team in Scotland still in existence.

Montrose first played on the Links before eventually moving to the first Links Park, which was situated to the east of Dorward House. The original Links Park was not considered to be suitable for football and the club moved to the present-day Links Park in 1887 on land rented from the 'Auld Kirk'.

Montrose made their Scottish Cup debut in 1887 with a 5–7 win away to Broughty. By 1890, Montrose had one of the stronger teams in the Scottish game. In the intervening years since the club's formation, they had beaten Aberdeen and played several teams from the West of Scotland such as Dumbarton, Third Lanark Volunteers and Glasgow Thistle.

In 1891, Alex 'Sandy' Keillor became the first Montrose player to receive a Scotland cap in a call-up for their win against Wales in Wrexham. Keillor received one more cap during his time at Montrose, scoring the opening goal in a 3–2 victory over Ireland in Belfast during the 1891–92 British Home Championship. Fellow 'Gable Endie' George Bowman was also capped in that match. To this day, Bowman and Keillor remain the only players to be selected for Scotland whilst playing for Montrose.

George Bowman also captained Montrose to their first piece of silverware, the Forfarshire Cup, with a 5–3 win over Dundee East End in the 1892 final at West Craigie Park.

In 1921, Montrose won the Scottish Qualifying Cup after defeating Nithsdale Wanderers 2–1 in the second replay of the final at Ibrox.

They joined the Scottish Football League in 1923, along with near-neighbours Brechin City, in the newly founded Third Division. In 1923–24 they achieved a creditable fourth-placed finish. However, the following season Montrose finished at the bottom of the table, and despite signs of a recovery in 1925–26, lost their league place when the Third Division was scrapped owing to the financial difficulties experienced by many of the member clubs. Montrose are one of only two teams from the sixteen teams in the 1925–26 Third Division who are still competing today in the SPFL.

The club was re-admitted to the Second Division in 1929–30. In the 1930s, the first few league seasons after re-admission were difficult, with the club regularly finishing in the bottom four of the table. Montrose did however reach the quarter-finals of the 1929–30 Scottish Cup, drawn away to eventual winners Rangers. Perhaps the best result of that difficult decade came in the 1938–39 Scottish Cup, when in the first round, Montrose sensationally knocked out holders East Fife by a 2–1 scoreline at Bayview Park.

Post-war Period 
In the immediate postwar period, Montrose spent time playing in the newly formed Division C, consisting of provincial clubs and some first division reserve sides. In the 1947–48 Scottish Cup Montrose played Celtic at Celtic Park in the quarter-finals, losing 4–0. With the re-formation of the Second Division in 1955–56, the club once again joined that league.

Halcyon Days 

The club's halcyon period was the mid-1970s when, under player-manager Alex Stuart, Montrose reached third place in the old First Division, and were a feared and respected cup side, notably reaching the semi-final of the 1975–76 Scottish League Cup and the quarter-finals of the Scottish Cup in 1972–73 and 1975–76 - to this day their best performances in both respective cups. In the second round of 1974–75 Scottish Cup, Montrose recorded their largest victory when they beat Vale of Leithen 12–0. Although this was an "away" fixture, due to a fire at their oppositions ground this tie was played at Links Park. In the 1975–76 Scottish Cup quarter-final, Montrose were only 90 seconds away from a famous victory in front of over 8,000 spectators at Links Park against Hearts, until an injury time equaliser from Graham Shaw sent the match to a replay. If Montrose had beat Hearts, they would have potentially earned a match-up against Lokomotive Leipzig in the 1976–77 European Cup Winners' Cup as probable Scottish Cup runners-up.

Montrose won their first championship under the guidance of Iain Stewart in 1984–85, as they triumphed in the old Second Division. Relegation followed in 1987 as the part-time club found themselves outgunned in a league largely consisting of full-time teams.

The 1990s 
Under co-managers Doug Rougvie and Chic McLelland, Montrose won promotion to Division One in 1991, after finishing as runners-up to Stirling Albion, but were relegated after one further season in the higher league.

Montrose have spent the vast majority of their recent history in the relative obscurity of the Third Division. At the end of the 1994–95 season, they were promoted to the Second Division after finishing second behind champions Forfar Athletic. However, the team's first attempt at this higher level was not successful, as they finished bottom of the table in 1995–96.

21st Century 
In the second round of the 2003–04 League Cup, Montrose were drawn away to SPL side Hibernian where they were crushed 9–0.

Following a disappointing beginning to 2005–06 season, manager Henry Hall left the club by mutual consent, shortly followed by assistant Ian Gilzean. Former Montrose player Eddie Wolecki was appointed new manager of the team on 12 December 2005. In July 2006 Aberdeen businessman Kenny Black invested money in the club and was offered a place on the board which he accepted. David Robertson (ex Aberdeen, Rangers and Leeds United player) became co-manager with Wolecki, but the latter parted company with the club in September 2006. Following a very poor run of results David Robertson left the club in early 2007, replaced in time by ex-St Johnstone stalwart Jim Weir, assisted by experienced defender Kevin McGowne.

Links Park underwent a transformation ahead of the 2007–08 campaign. A new artificial pitch was laid, so the game on 21 April 2007 was the last game on grass for the foreseeable future. A smaller training pitch was installed beside the main stand. New state of the art catering facilities and changing rooms were also installed. The fortunes of the club on the pitch also improved with several big name signings and a great start to the season propelled Montrose into the top four for the majority of the season. Montrose came in third in the league and were pitted against Stranraer in the Second Division playoffs. A 1–1 draw in the first leg at Links Park, was followed by a second leg in which Montrose went down 3–0. They were thus confined to the Third Division for yet another season.

The 2008–09 pre-season was very quiet and few new signings were made; rumblings of discontent and rumours of behind the scenes fighting were proved to be true as boss Jim Weir was sacked by the Board after a 2–1 defeat to Cowdenbeath with six months still to run on his contract. U17's boss Steve Adam took the reins before ex-Dundee United and Celtic defender David Hannah became caretaker boss. Hannah left the club in mid-December after a poor defeat to Cowdenbeath. During this game, fans made their feelings felt after Hannah threatened a fan and criticised the away support from the previous week after the dreadful 5–0 defeat away at East Stirlingshire. Director of Football Kenny Black took the reins over the Christmas period until Montrose appointed Steven Tweed as player-manager. During January many of the players from Jim Weir's reign were shipped out and a number of new loanees appeared. Things began to gel and Montrose won six out of their last nine games with a smaller, much younger squad who narrowly missed out on the playoffs.

The 2009–10 season began terribly for the Montrose faithful, with the team failing to win any Division Three matches at all up to 16 January. However, the club reached the 2009–10 Scottish Cup fifth round, where they were defeated by Hibernian at Easter Road. On 10 April, Brian Winton stepped down as chairman. The club finished bottom of the Third Division for the first time in eleven years.

2011 saw Steven Tweed finally step down due to work commitments with the RBS. Ray Farningham & Stuart Garden were given the job of leading the team till the end of the season however the board moved quickly to secure the pair on two year contracts. In the final game of the season popular player Hugh Davidson chose to retire from the game.

At the end of the 2014–15 season, Montrose came last in League Two, but maintained their status in the SPFL after a 3–2 aggregate win in a play-off against Highland Football League champions Brora Rangers. Two goals in the second-half of the home leg by Marvin Andrews and Gary Wood saved the club from dropping into non-league football.

Stewart Petrie Era 
Stewart Petrie was appointed manager in December 2016 after the sacking of Paul Hegarty a month earlier due to a run of poor performances, which led to the club sitting bottom of League Two. The appointment of Petrie vastly improved the fortunes of the team, achieving a 4th place finish at the end of season and qualification for the League One playoffs for the first time in nine years. Montrose ended up losing 4–1 on aggregate to Peterhead in the playoff semi-final.

The 2017–18 season was more notable for altogether happier reasons. Montrose were promoted as League Two champions finishing one point ahead of Peterhead, who had pushed them all the way to the last game. This saw Montrose end 22 consecutive seasons in Scotland’s fourth tier.

After promotion, Petrie continued to steer the club in a favourable direction in League One, achieving top four finishes and Championship playoff spots for four consecutive seasons. Montrose also reached the round of 16 of the 2020–21 Scottish Cup, their best performance in over a decade, losing to Kilmarnock 3–1 at Rugby Park in the fourth round. Their third place finish in the 2021–22 League One season was the highest for the club in the Scottish football league system since their 12th place finish in the 1985–86 old First Division.

Rivalries 
Montrose share a strong rivalry with local side Arbroath, and matches between the two are usually intense and widely anticipated by both sides. Montrose also share local rivalries with fellow Angus sides Brechin City and Forfar Athletic, with games played by two of any of these teams (including Arbroath) being known as Angus derbies.

First-team squad

On loan

Club officials

Executive 
Honorary President: John F. Paton
Honorary Vice President: Malcolm Watters
Chairman: John Crawford
Vice-Chairman: David Laing
Chief Executive Officer: Peter Stuart
Finance Manager: Iain Bridges
Safety Officer: Alan Kenny 
Secretary: Brian Petrie
Assistant Secretary: Andrew Stephen
Directors: Peter Davidson, Michael Fotheringham, Barry O'Neill, Tracy Park
Operations Manager: Davey Byrne
Company Secretary: Kenneth Bruce, Messrs T. Duncan & Co.

Coaching staff 
Manager: Stewart Petrie
Assistant manager: Ross Campbell
First-team coaches: Iain Campbell, Seán Dillon
Goalkeeping coach: Vacant
Club doctor: Gareth Strachan
Chartered Physiotherapist: Gemma Collier
Physiotherapist: Scott Shepherd
Sports scientist: Chris Simpson
Groundsman/Kitman: Ronnie Marquis
Assistant Kitmen: Robert Ogg, Neil McIntosh

Honours

League
Scottish Football League Second Division (third tier):
Winners: 1984–85
Runners-up: 1990–91
Scottish Football League Third Division / Scottish League Two (fourth tier):
Winners: 2017–18
Runners-up: 1994–95
Northern League
Winners: 1903–04
Runners-up: 1891–92
Forfarshire County League (Carry Cup)
Winners: 1894–95, 1910–11
Runners-up: 1897–98

Cup
Scottish Qualifying Cup:
Winners: 1921
Scottish Qualifying Cup Midlands:
Winners: 1947
Scottish Qualifying Cup South:
Runners-up: 1948
Forfarshire Cup:
Winners (10): 1891–92, 1921–22, 1926–27, 1931–32, 1932–33, 1951–52, 1961–62, 1972–73, 1991–92, 2001–02
Runners-up: 1902–03, 1903–04, 1907–08, 1912–13, 1929–30, 1935–36, 1954–55, 1986–87, 2002–03, 2007–08
Forfarshire Charity Cup:
Winners: 1892–93
Runners-up: 1888–89

Club records 

 Best league position: 3rd in First Division, 1975–76
 Best Scottish Cup performance: Quarter-finals, 1929–30, 1947–48, 1972–73, 1975–76 
 Best League Cup performance: Semi-finals, 1975–76
 Record home attendance: 8,983 v Dundee, Scottish Cup Quarter-final, 17 March 1973.
 Biggest victory: 12–0 v Vale of Leithen, Scottish Cup 2nd round, 4 January 1975
 Heaviest defeat: 13–0 v Aberdeen 'A', Scottish Division C, 17 March 1951
 Most appearances: 500, Les Barr
 Most goals: 165, Bobby Livingstone
 Most capped player: Alex Keillor, 2 caps for Scotland
 Record transfer fee paid: £17,500 to Airdrieonians for Jim Smith, February 1992
 Record transfer fee received: £50,000 from Hibernian for Gary Murray, December 1980

International club friendlies

Notable players

International capped players 
Bold denotes player still actively playing international football.

In November 2022, former Montrose forward, Martin Boyle was named as a member of the Australia squad at the 2022 World Cup. He is the only the third former Montrose player to have also been a member of a World Cup squad, with the others being Jimmy Rooney, a member of the Australia squad at the 1974 World Cup, and Marvin Andrews, a member of the Trinidad and Tobago squad at the 2006 World Cup. Unfortunately, both Boyle and Andrews sustained injuries prior their respective World Cups and thus Rooney is the only former Montrose player to actually play in the World Cup.

Other notable players 
Bold denotes player still actively playing with the club. Those in italics are inductees in the Montrose Hall of Fame.
  Les Barr
  Ivo den Bieman
  Dennis D'Arcy
  Hugh Davidson
  Seán Dillon
  Harry Johnston
  Bobby Livingstone
  Colin McGlashan
  Chic McLelland
  Gary Murray
  John Sheran
  Ian Stewart
  Alex Stuart
  Graham Webster

References

Notes

External links 

Official websites
 

News sites
 Montrose F.C. BBC webpage

 
Football clubs in Scotland
Association football clubs established in 1879
Football clubs in Angus, Scotland
1879 establishments in Scotland
Scottish Football League teams
Scottish Professional Football League teams
Montrose, Angus